Some sovereign states refuse entry to all citizens of certain states. These restrictions differ from travel visa requirements, which require travelers to obtain permission to enter a country in advance of their travel. With few exceptions, citizens of the states in this list are prohibited from entering the corresponding listed states. Such prohibitions are often referred to as travel bans, although that term can have other meanings.

List of travel bans by refused citizenship

See also
 USA Executive Order 13769
 USA Executive Order 13780

References

International sanctions
People excluded from countries